{{DISPLAYTITLE:C12H16N2O}}
The molecular formula C12H16N2O (molar mass: 204.26 g/mol, exact mass: 204.126263 u) may refer to:

 Bufotenin
 Dimethyltryptamine-N-oxide
 5-MeO-AMT
 5-MeO-NMT
 Nebracetam
 Psilocin